Wang Changtai (born 25 March 1955) is a Chinese former footballer.

Club career
Born in Dalian, in 1965, Wang joined the Dalian Amateur Sports School. In 1970, Wang joined Liaoning, winning the 1978 Chinese National League during his time at the club. In 1981, Wang signed for Dalian Shipyard, later renamed to Dalian, winning the 1981 Yi League and the 1983 Jia-B League at the club.

International career
On 19 July 1977, Wang made his debut for China, scoring in a 3–2 win against Zaire.

International goals
Scores and results list China's goal tally first.

Coaching career
Following his retirement in 1984, Wang took up a coaching role at Dalian's women's team. In 1991, Wang was appointed head coach of China's women's youth team. In 1998, Wang managed China's youth teams. The following year, Wang was appointed manager of Shaanxi Guoli, remaining with the club until 2000. During the 2001 season, Wang managed Zhejiang Greentown on an interim basis, following joining Zhejiang in 2000. At the end of the 2003 season, Wang left Zhejiang Greentown.

References

1955 births
Living people
Footballers from Dalian
Association football forwards
Chinese footballers
Chinese football managers
China international footballers
Liaoning F.C. players
Dalian Shide F.C. players
Footballers at the 1978 Asian Games
Medalists at the 1978 Asian Games
Asian Games bronze medalists for China
Asian Games medalists in football
Zhejiang Professional F.C. managers
Association football coaches